Thymus lotocephalus is a species of flowering plant in the mint family Lamiaceae, endemic to southern Portugal, specifically central Algarve. It inhabits both the coast and the interior (Barrocal). On the coast it is found in pine forest clearings and xerophilic scrub, on sandy, acidic substrates. On the interior, in thyme and clearings of xerophilic scrub, on marginal or calcareous substrates, somewhat decarbonated.

References

lotocephalus
Endemic flora of Portugal
Endemic flora of the Iberian Peninsula